Jeff Harvey (born 1957 in Toronto, Ontario, Canada) is a Senior Scientist in the Department of Multitrophic Interactions at the Netherlands Institute of Ecology, and formerly an associate editor of Nature.

Harvey specializes in research concerning:
 "Intra-interspecific variation in plant quality and its effects on herbivores, parasitoids and hyperparasitoids; linking above- and below ground multitrophic interactions via plant defense."
 "Life-history, foraging and developmental strategies in hyperparasitoids."
 "Spatial and temporal effects on multitrophic interactions."
 "Science, ecology and advocacy."

See also
The Skeptical Environmentalist; Harvey was prominent among the many critics of this book.

References

External links
Personal webpage

Canadian ecologists
1957 births
Living people